Death in the Andes (Lituma en los Andes) is a 1993 novel by the Nobel Prize-winning Peruvian author Mario Vargas Llosa. It follows the character Lituma, from Who Killed Palomino Molero?, after being transferred to the rural town of Naccos.

Plot
Corporal Lituma has been transferred as punishment to the tiny Andean community of Naccos, where almost everyone besides him, his adjutant Tomás Carreño, and the vaguely threatening owners of the local bar are there as builders. Three men from the village disappear and Lituma has to investigate, alongside his heartbroken young adjutant, the only other local policeman. Was it the terrucos of the Maoist Shining Path or something even more terrible that caused these vanishings?

Themes
This novel examines the tactics and motivations of the Maoists, but situates their violence in the context of an older world where life is brutal and in a society which is on the very fringe of the modern world.

A lot of  magic realism is employed, with a great deal of references to old, "indian" spirituality, and to pishtacos, vampires of Andean folklore.

References

External links
Book review

1997 novels
Novels by Mario Vargas Llosa
Novels set in Peru
internal conflict in Peru